The FIM Gorzow Speedway Grand Prix of Poland was the eleventh and final race of the 2011 Speedway Grand Prix season. It took place on October 8 at the Edward Jancarz Stadium in Gorzów Wielkopolski, Poland.

Riders 
The Speedway Grand Prix Commission nominated Darcy Ward as Wild Card, and Bartosz Zmarzlik and Kamil Pulczyński both as Track Reserves. The Draw was made on October 7.

Results 
It was second Grand Prix event (last time 2011 Swedish SGP) which was stopped before holding all heats (after Heat 16). According to "FIM Speedway World Championship Grand Prix Regulations (2011 edition)", points scored before Heat 16 is approved as an event result.

Grand Prix was won by Greg Hancock who beat Nicki Pedersen, Emil Sayfutdinov and Tomasz Gollob.

Heat details

Heat after heat 
 (63,78) Pedersen, Kołodziej, Harris, Holta (X)
 (62,70) Hancock, Holder, Łaguta, Lindbäck
 (63,30) Ward, Jonsson, Gollob, Lindgren
 (62,06) Hampel, Bjerre, Crump, Sayfutdinov
 (60,98) Jonsson, Pedersen, Bjerre, Holder
 (63,50) Crump, Gollob, Lindbäck, Kołodziej
 (63,91) Harris, Sayfutdinov, Lindgren, Łaguta
 (63,38) Hancock, Hampel, Ward, Holta
 (63,59) Pedersen, Lindgren, Lindbäck, Hampel
 (63,34) Sayfutdinov, Kołodziej, Holder, Ward
 (64,19) Harris, Hancock, Crump, Jonsson
 (64,43) Gollob, Łaguta, Bjerre, Holta (X)
 (64,25) Ward, Pedersen, Crump, Łaguta
 (63,81) Hancock, Lindgren, Kołodziej, Bjerre
 (65,81) Holder, Gollob, Hampel, Harris (X)
 (67,44) Sayfutdinov, Jonsson, Lindbäck, Holta

The intermediate classification

References

See also 
 motorcycle speedway

Speedway Grand Prix of Poland II
Poland 2
2011
Sport in Gorzów Wielkopolski